Richville is a populated place situated in Apache County, Arizona, United States. Established approximately 12 miles north from Springerville on the Little Colorado River, it was originally named Walnut Grove, after a stand of walnut trees found in the location. It became known as Richey, after Joseph P. Richey, whose family settled the community. The name eventually morphed into the current Richville. A post office was opened there on June 23, 1892.

References

External links
 Richville – ghosttowns.com

Ghost towns in Arizona
Populated places in Apache County, Arizona